Edom (lit.: "red";  Akkadian:  ,  ;) was an ancient kingdom in  Transjordan, located between Moab to the northeast, the Arabah to the west, and the Arabian Desert to the south and east. Most of its former territory is now divided between present-day southern Israel and Jordan. Edom appears in written sources relating to the late Bronze Age and to the Iron Age in the Levant.

Edomites are related in several ancient sources including the Tanakh, a list of the Egyptian pharaoh Seti I from c. 1215 BC as well as in the chronicle of a campaign by Ramesses III (r. 1186–1155 BC). Archaeological investigation has shown that the nation flourished between the 13th and the 8th century BC and was destroyed after a period of decline in the 6th century BC by the Babylonians. After the fall of the kingdom of Edom, the Edomites were pushed westward towards southern  Judah by nomadic tribes coming from the east; among them were the Nabataeans, who first appeared in the historical annals of the 4th century BC and had already established their own kingdom in what used to be Edom by the first half of the 2nd century BC. More recent excavations show that the process of Edomite settlement in the southern parts of the Kingdom of Judah and parts of the Negev down to Timna had started already before the destruction of the kingdom by Nebuchadnezzar II in 587/86 BC, both by peaceful penetration and by military means and taking advantage of the already-weakened state of Judah.

Once pushed out of their territory, the Edomites settled during the Persian period in an area comprising the southern hills of Judea down to the area north of Be'er Sheva. The people appear under a Greek form of their old name, as Idumeans or Idumaeans, and their new territory was called Idumea or Idumaea (Greek: Ἰδουμαία, Idoumaía; Latin: Idūmaea), a term that was used in the Hellenistic and Roman periods, also mentioned in the New Testament. During the 2nd century BC, the Edomites were forcibly converted to Judaism by the Hasmoneans, and were incorporated into the Jewish nation.

Edom and Idumea are two related but distinct terms; they relate to a historically-contiguous population but to two separate, if adjacent, territories which the Edomites/Idumeans occupied in different periods of their history. The Edomites first established a kingdom ("Edom") in the southern area of modern-day Jordan and later migrated into the southern parts of the Kingdom of Judah ("Idumea", modern-day Mount Hebron) when Judah was first weakened and then destroyed by the Babylonians in the 6th century BC.

Name of Edom in the Hebrew Bible
The Hebrew word Edom means "red", and the Hebrew Bible relates it to the name of its founder, Esau, the elder son of the Hebrew patriarch Isaac, because he was born "red all over". As a young adult, he sold his birthright to his brother Jacob for a portion of "red pottage". The Tanakh describes the Edomites as descendants of Esau.

Archaeology

The Edomites may have been connected with the Shasu and Shutu, nomadic raiders mentioned in Egyptian sources. Indeed, a letter from an Egyptian scribe at a border fortress in the Wadi Tumilat during the reign of Merneptah reports movement of nomadic "shasu-tribes of Edom" to watering holes in Egyptian territory. The earliest Iron Age settlements—possibly copper mining camps—date to the 11th century BC. Settlement intensified by the late 8th century BC and the main sites so far excavated have been dated between the 8th and 6th centuries BC. The last unambiguous reference to Edom is an Assyrian inscription of 667 BC. Edom ceased to exist as a state when it became conquered by Nabonidus in the 6th century BC.

According to the Egyptian inscriptions, the "Aduma" at times extended their possessions to the borders of Egypt. After the conquest of Judah by the Babylonians, Edomites settled in the region of Hebron. They prospered in this new country, called by the Greeks and Romans "Idumaea" or "Idumea", for more than four centuries. Strabo, writing around the time of Jesus, held that the Idumaeans, whom he identified as of Nabataean origin, constituted the majority of the population of Western Judea, where they commingled with the Judaeans and adopted their customs. A view shared by modern scholarly works which consider these Idumaeans as of Arab, possibly Nabataean, stock.

The existence of the Kingdom of Edom was asserted by archaeologists led by Ezra Ben-Yosef and Tom Levy, by using a methodology called the punctuated equilibrium model in 2019. Archaeologists mainly took copper samples from Timna Valley and Faynan in Jordan’s Arava valley dated to 1300-800 BC. According to the results of the analysis, the researchers thought that Pharaoh Shoshenk I of Egypt (the Biblical "Shishak"), who attacked Jerusalem in the 10th century BC, encouraged the trade and production of copper instead of destroying the region. Tel Aviv University professor Ben Yosef stated "Our new findings contradict the view of many archaeologists that the Arava was populated by a loose alliance of tribes, and they’re consistent with the biblical story that there was an Edomite kingdom here."

Hebrew Bible

The Edomites' original country, according to the Hebrew Bible, stretched from the Sinai peninsula as far as Kadesh Barnea. It reached as far south as Eilat, which was the seaport of Edom. On the north of Edom was the territory of Moab. The boundary between Moab and Edom was the brook of Zered. The ancient capital of Edom was Bozrah. According to Genesis, Esau's descendants settled in the land after they had displaced the Horites. It was also called the land of Seir; Mount Seir appears to have been strongly identified with them and may have been a cultic site. According to biblical narrative, at the time of Amaziah (838 BC), Selah was its principal stronghold, Eilat and Ezion-geber its seaports.

Genesis 36:31-43 lists the kings of Edom "before any Israelite king reigned":

These are the kings who ruled in the land of Edom before a king ruled the children of Israel. And Bela ben Beor ruled in Edom, and the name of his city was Dinhabah. And Bela died, and Jobab ben Zerah from Bozrah ruled in his place. And Jobab died, and Husham of the land of Temani ruled in his place. And Husham died, and Hadad ben Bedad, who struck Midian in the field of Moab, ruled in his place, and the name of his city was Avith. And Hadad died, and Samlah of Masrekah ruled in his place. And Samlah died, and Saul of Rehoboth on the river ruled in his place. And Saul died, and Baal-hanan ben Achbor ruled in his place. And Baal-hanan ben Achbor died, and Hadar ruled in his place, and the name of his city was Pau, and his wife's name was Mehetabel bat Matred bat Mezahab. And these are the names of the clans of Esau by their families, by their places, by their names: clan Timnah, clan Alvah, clan Jetheth, clan Aholibamah, clan Elah, clan Pinon, clan Kenaz, clan Teman, clan Mibzar, clan Magdiel, clan Iram.

The Hebrew word translated as leader of a clan is aluf, used solely to describe the Dukes of Edom and Moab, in the first five books of Moses. However beginning in the books of the later prophets the word is used to describe Judean generals, for example, in the prophecies of Zachariah twice (9:7, 12:5–6) it had evolved to describe Jewish captains, the word also is used multiple times as a general term for teacher or guide for example in Psalm 55:13. Aluph as it is used to denote teach or guide from the Edomite word for Duke is used 69 times in the Tanakh.

If the account may be taken at face value, the kingship of Edom was, at least in early times, not hereditary, perhaps elective. The first book of Chronicles mentions both a king and chieftains. Moses and the Israelite people twice appealed to their common ancestry and asked the king of Edom for passage through his land, along the "King's Highway", on their way to Canaan, but the king refused permission. Accordingly, they detoured around the country because of his show of force or because God ordered them to do so rather than wage war. The King of Edom did not attack the Israelites, though he prepared to resist aggression.

Nothing further is recorded of the Edomites in the Tanakh until their defeat by King Saul of Israel in the late 11th century BC. Forty years later King David and his general Joab defeated the Edomites in the "Valley of Salt" (probably near the Dead Sea;). An Edomite prince named Hadad escaped and fled to Egypt, and after David's death returned and tried to start a rebellion, but failed and went to Syria (Aramea). From that time Edom remained a vassal of Israel. David placed over the Edomites Israelite governors or prefects, and this form of government seems to have continued under Solomon. When Israel divided into two kingdoms Edom became a dependency of the Kingdom of Judah. In the time of Jehoshaphat (c. 870 – 849 BC) the Tanakh mentions a king of Edom, who was probably an Israelite deputy appointed by the King of Judah. It also states that the inhabitants of Mount Seir invaded Judea in conjunction with Ammon and Moab, and that the invaders turned against one another and were all destroyed. Edom revolted against Jehoram and elected a king of its own. Amaziah attacked and defeated the Edomites, seizing Selah, but the Israelites never subdued Edom completely.

In the time of Nebuchadnezzar II the Edomites may have helped plunder Jerusalem and slaughter the Judaeans in 587 or 586 BCE. Some believe that it is for this reason the prophets denounced Edom (Obadiah passim). Evidence also suggests that at that time Edom may have engaged in a treaty betrayal of Judah.  The people of Edom would be dealt with during the Messiah's rulership, according to the prophets.  Regarding the territory of Edom, the book of Jeremiah states that "no one will live there, nor will anyone of mankind reside in it".     

Although the Idumaeans controlled the lands to the east and south of the Dead Sea, their peoples were held in contempt by the Israelites. Hence the Book of Psalms says "Moab is my washpot: over Edom will I cast out my shoe". According to the Torah, the congregation could not receive descendants of a marriage between an Israelite and an Edomite until the fourth generation. This law was a subject of controversy between Shimon ben Yohai, who said it applied only to male descendants, and other Tannaim, who said female descendants were also excluded for four generations. From these, some early conversion laws in halacha were derived.

Classical Idumaea

Maccabean revolt 
During the revolt of the Maccabees against the Seleucid kingdom (early 2nd century BC), II Maccabees refers to a Seleucid general named Gorgias as "Governor of Idumaea"; whether he was a Greek or a Hellenized Edomite is unknown. Some scholars maintain that the reference to Idumaea in that passage is an error altogether. Judas Maccabeus conquered their territory for a time around 163 BC.

Conversion to Judaism 
Around 110 BCE, Hasmonean leader John Hyrcanus I conquered Idumaea. According to several ancient sources, including Josephus and Ptolemy, he forcibly converted them to Judaism, and incorporated them into the Jewish nation:

Some scholars dispute the claim of forced circumcision and believe that the Idumeans were gradually and mostly voluntarily assimilated into Jewish society. According to Strabo:

Herodian dynasty 
Antipater the Idumaean, the progenitor of the Herodian Dynasty along with Judean progenitors, that ruled Judea after the Roman conquest, was of Edomite origin. Under Herod the Great, the Idumaea province was ruled for him by a series of governors, among whom were his brother Joseph ben Antipater, and his brother-in-law Costobarus.

Borders 
Josephus, when referring to Upper Idumaea, speaks of towns and villages immediately to the south and south-west of Jerusalem, such as Hebron (Antiq. 12.8.6,Wars 4.9.7), Halhul, in Greek called Alurus (Wars 4.9.6), Bethsura (Antiq. 12.9.4), Begabris (Wars 4.8.1.), Dura (Adorayim) (Antiq. 13.9.1, Wars 1.2.5), Caphethra (Wars 4.9.9), Bethletephon (Wars 4.8.1), Tekoa (Wars 4.9.5), and Marissa (Antiq. 13.9.1, Wars 1.2.5), the latter being a principal city of Idumaea after the influx of Idumaeans into the Mount Hebron region, shortly after the demise of the kingdom of Judah and the Judean exile in the 6th-century BC.

Archaeological records gleaned from Maresha, though largely of Idumaean origin, attest to the region being under the influences of Greek culture, as well as that of Nabatean/Arab, Phoenician, Palmyrene and Jewish culture.

The Gospel of Mark includes Idumea, along with Judea, Jerusalem, Tyre, Sidon and lands east of the Jordan as the communities from which crowds came to Jesus by the Sea of Galilee. The Mishnah refers to Rabbi Ishmael's dwelling place in Kfar Aziz as being "near to Edom."

First Jewish-Roman War 
By 66 CE, during the First Jewish–Roman War, the Zealot leader Simon bar Giora attacked the Jewish converts of Upper Idumaea, and brought near complete destruction to the surrounding villages and countryside in that region.

According to Josephus, during the siege of Jerusalem in 70 CE by Titus, 20,000 Idumaeans, under the leadership of John, Simon, Phinehas, and Jacob, joined the Zealots as they besieged the Temple.

After the Jewish-Roman Wars, the Idumaean people disappear from written history, though the geographical region of "Idumea" is still referred to at the time of Jerome.

Religion

The nature of Edomite religion is largely unknown before their conversion to Judaism by the Hasmoneans. Epigraphical evidence suggests that the national god of Edom was Qaus (קוס) (also known as 'Qaush', 'Kaush', 'Kaus', 'Kos' or 'Qaws'), since Qaus is invoked in the blessing formula in letters and appear in personal names found in ancient Edom. As close relatives of other Levantine Semites and Arabs, they seem to have worshiped such gods as El, Baal and 'Uzza. The oldest biblical traditions place Yahweh as the deity of southern Edom, and may have originated in "Edom/Seir/Teman/Sinai" before being adopted in Israel and Judah. There is a Jewish tradition stemming from the Talmud, that the descendants of Esau would eventually become the Romans, and to a larger extent, all Europeans.

Josephus states that Costobarus, appointed by Herod to be governor of Idumea and Gaza, was descended from the priests of "the Koze, whom the Idumeans had formerly served as a god".

Victor Sasson describes an archaeological text that may well be Edomite, reflecting on the language, literature, and religion of Edom.

Economy
The Kingdom of Edom drew much of its livelihood from the caravan trade between Egypt, the Levant, Mesopotamia, and southern Arabia, along the Incense Route. Astride the King's Highway, the Edomites were one of several states in the region for whom trade was vital due to the scarcity of arable land. It is also said that sea routes traded as far away as India, with ships leaving from the port of Ezion-Geber. Edom's location on the southern highlands left it with only a small strip of land that received sufficient rain for farming. Edom probably exported salt and balsam (used for perfume and temple incense in the ancient world) from the Dead Sea region.

Khirbat en-Nahas is a large-scale copper-mining site excavated by archaeologist Thomas Levy in what is now southern Jordan. The scale of tenth-century mining on the site is regarded as evidence of a strong, centralized 10th century BC Edomite kingdom.

See also
 Edomite language
 Habiru
 Herodian Dynasty
 List of rulers of Edom

References

Bibliography

External links

 UCSD article on age of Edom

 
States and territories established in the 13th century BC
States and territories disestablished in the 2nd century BC
Torah places
Semitic-speaking peoples
Groups who converted to Judaism
Aqaba
Former kingdoms
Transjordan (region)